The SG Post/Süd Regensburg was a German association football club from the city of Regensburg, Bavaria. The club is still active in many sports, having twenty-two separate departments, but no longer fields a football side since that department left to merge with Jahn Regensburg in 2002.

History
Formed in 1928, the club made its first notable appearance on the German football scene when it qualified for the DFB-Pokal (German Cup) competition in 1981, then under the name Post SV Regensburg as a fifth division Bezirksliga side. Away at Tennis Borussia Berlin, the team left a good impression, losing to the Oberliga Berlin (III) club 4–3 in Berlin. That same season, 1981–82, the club won promotion to the tier-four Landesliga Bayern-Mitte as well.

It played only a Landesliga single season, but was back two years later, for an eleven-year stint from 1985 to 1996. As an additional attraction, the league often included local powerhouse Jahn Regensburg which had fallen on hard times. In 1988, the club merged with TSG Süd Regensburg to form the SG Post/Süd Regensburg.

After a number of seasons spent mid-table, the club began to improve in 1993 and earned promotion to the Oberliga Bayern in 1996 after winning a Landesliga title. It managed to stay at this level for three seasons, a third place in 1997–98 being the absolute highlight. In the 1997–98 season, former German international Dieter Eckstein played for the club. The team also made another appearance in the German Cup in 1998. Twice in this era, the club was coached by Karsten Wettberg, one of the most successful coaches in Bavarian amateur football, having six Bavarian championships in his name.

The season after, it was relegated from the Oberliga but managed to break the fall and remain a good Landesliga side. In 2002, the club earned promotion to the Oberliga once more, but refused the move, instead merging its football department with Jahn Regensburg and becoming that club's reserve side, playing in the Oberliga. Parent club SG Post/Süd still exists, but no longer has a football department.

Honours
The club's honours:

League
 Landesliga Bayern-Mitte (V)
 Champions: (2) 1996, 2002

Cup
 Bavarian Cup
 Runners-up: 1998
 Oberpfalz Cup
 Winners: 1998
 Runners-up: 2000

Youth
 Under 17 Bayernliga
 Runners-up: 1998

Final seasons
The season-by-season performance of the club in its final years:

With the introduction of the Bezirksoberligas in 1988 as the new fifth tier, below the Landesligas, all leagues below dropped one tier. With the introduction of the Regionalligas in 1994 as the new third tier, below the 2. Bundesliga, all leagues below dropped one tier.

DFB Cup appearances
The club reached the first round of the German Cup twice, both times against a club from Berlin:

References

External links
Official team site
SG Post/Süd profile at Weltfussball.de
Das deutsche Fußball-Archiv historical German domestic league tables 

Football clubs in Germany
Defunct football clubs in Germany
Defunct football clubs in Bavaria
Association football clubs established in 1928
Sport in Regensburg
Football in Upper Palatinate
1928 establishments in Germany
Association football clubs disestablished in 2002
2002 disestablishments in Germany